Rob Brown is a Canadian television journalist and anchor for CBC News Calgary.

Early life
Brown was born in Vancouver, British Columbia and raised in Ladner, British Columbia. Brown had graduated British Columbia Institute of Technology in 1997, attending its journalism program.

Newscasting career
Brown began his career as a photojournalist at a CTV affiliate in Yorkton, Saskatchewan. After briefly leaving CTV to cover the Legislative Assembly of Alberta and Ralph Klein, Brown had eventually returned to British Columbia. Since then, Brown had held a number of positions such as being CTV's bureau chief for Vancouver for CTV Vancouver. Brown was also the lead reporter for CTV during the 2010 Winter Olympics. During his career, Brown had won a number of journalistic awards including the Jack Webster Award for Best News Reporting and the Edward R. Murrow Award for Best Hard News Feature.

Brown became an international celebrity for his coverage of the 2011 Stanley Cup riot, from which he reported live for CTV. Brown became a trending topic on Twitter during the riots, and earned the top spot on SportsIllustrated.com's Media Power List for June 2011. In August 2013, Brown joined CBC Calgary as anchor alongside his wife Rosa Marchitelli and became the first married couple anchors in Canadian television news history.

References

External links
CBC Calgary– Rob Brown

British Columbia Institute of Technology alumni
Canadian television reporters and correspondents
Living people
Journalists from British Columbia
People from Delta, British Columbia
People from Vancouver
Year of birth missing (living people)
Jack Webster award recipients